1st Bangor Old Boys Football Club, also known as 1st Bangor O.B., is a Northern Irish, intermediate football club playing in the Premier Division of the Northern Amateur Football League.

A club of the same name was in existence from 1938–1965, but the present club was founded in 1967, and joined the Amateur League in 1979, winning the Junior Cup in the same season.

Originally from Bangor, County Down, the club is now based at the Drome in Newtownards.

Honours

Junior honours
Irish Junior Cup (1): 1979–80
County Antrim Junior Shield (2): 1980–81, 1982–83

References

External links 
 nifootball.co.uk - (For fixtures, results and tables of all Northern Ireland amateur football leagues)

Association football clubs in Northern Ireland
Association football clubs established in 1967
Association football clubs in County Down
Northern Amateur Football League clubs
1967 establishments in Northern Ireland